Heracleium is an ancient city of Crete.

Heracleium or Herakleion may also refer to:
Heracleium (Bithynia), ancient town of Bithynia, now in Turkey
Heracleium (Egypt), ancient town of Egypt
Heracleium (Ionia), ancient town of Ionia, now in Turkey
Heracleium (Pieria), ancient town of Pieria
Heracleium (Pontus), ancient town of Pontus, now in Turkey

See also 
Heracleum (disambiguation)